In continuum mechanics, an Arruda–Boyce model is a hyperelastic constitutive model used to describe the mechanical behavior of rubber and other polymeric substances.  This model is based on the statistical mechanics of a material with a cubic representative volume element containing eight chains along the diagonal directions.  The material is assumed to be incompressible. The model is named after Ellen Arruda and Mary Cunningham Boyce, who published it in 1993.

The strain energy density function for the incompressible Arruda–Boyce model is given by

where  is the number of chain segments,  is the Boltzmann constant,  is the temperature in kelvins,  is the number of chains in the network of a cross-linked polymer,

For small deformations the Arruda–Boyce model reduces to the Gaussian network based neo-Hookean solid model.  It can be shown that the Gent model is a simple and accurate approximation of the Arruda–Boyce model.

Alternative expressions for the Arruda–Boyce model
An alternative form of the Arruda–Boyce model, using the first five terms of the inverse Langevin function, is

where  is a material constant.  The quantity  can also be interpreted as a measure of the limiting network stretch.

If  is the stretch at which the polymer chain network becomes locked, we can express the Arruda–Boyce strain energy density as

We may alternatively express the Arruda–Boyce model in the form

where  and

If the rubber is compressible, a dependence on  can be introduced into the strain energy density;  being the deformation gradient.  Several possibilities exist, among which the Kaliske–Rothert extension has been found to be reasonably accurate.  With that extension, the Arruda-Boyce strain energy density function can be expressed as

For consistency with linear elasticity, we must have  where  is the bulk modulus.

Consistency condition

From the Arruda–Boyce strain energy density function, we have,

Substituting in the values of  leads to the consistency condition

Stress-deformation relations
The Cauchy stress for the incompressible Arruda–Boyce model is given by

Uniaxial extension

From incompressibility . Hence .
Therefore,

The left Cauchy–Green deformation tensor can then be expressed as

If the directions of the principal stretches are oriented with the coordinate basis vectors, we have

If , we have

Therefore,

The engineering stress is

Equibiaxial extension
From incompressibility . Hence .
Therefore,

The left Cauchy–Green deformation tensor can then be expressed as

If the directions of the principal stretches are oriented with the coordinate basis vectors, we have

The engineering stress is

Planar extension
Planar extension tests are carried out on thin specimens which are constrained from deforming in one direction. From incompressibility . Hence .
Therefore,

The left Cauchy–Green deformation tensor can then be expressed as

If the directions of the principal stretches are oriented with the coordinate basis vectors, we have

The engineering stress is

Simple shear
The deformation gradient for a simple shear deformation has the form

where  are reference orthonormal basis vectors in the plane of deformation and the shear deformation is given by

In matrix form, the deformation gradient and the left Cauchy–Green deformation tensor may then be expressed as

Therefore,

and the Cauchy stress is given by

Statistical mechanics of polymer deformation

The Arruda–Boyce model is based on the statistical mechanics of polymer chains.  In this approach, each macromolecule is described as a chain of  segments, each of length .  If we assume that the initial configuration of a chain can be described by a random walk, then the initial chain length is

If we assume that one end of the chain is at the origin, then the probability that a block of size  around the origin will contain the other end of the chain, assuming a Gaussian probability density function, is

The configurational entropy of a single chain from Boltzmann statistical mechanics is

where  is a constant.  The total entropy in a network of  chains is therefore

where an affine deformation has been assumed.  Therefore the strain energy of the deformed network is

where  is the temperature.

Notes and references

See also
 Hyperelastic material
 Rubber elasticity
 Finite strain theory
 Continuum mechanics
 Strain energy density function
 Neo-Hookean solid
 Mooney–Rivlin solid
 Yeoh (hyperelastic model)
 Gent (hyperelastic model)

Continuum mechanics
Elasticity (physics)
Non-Newtonian fluids
Rubber properties
Solid mechanics
Polymer chemistry